Vlastelin ( vlastelini) is the Bosnian word for the "magnate", derived from vlast ("rule, power, authority, government, management, office"). Other words are velmoža and velikaš, sometimes used interchangeably, particularly to designate regional lords. Vlastelin was used when referring to the highest and most powerful nobility in medieval Bosnia. Also, in Serbia and Croatia of the era, the velikaš and velmoža were most likely terms used in place of vlastelin.
From vlastelin the term vlasteličić was derived for lower or lesser vlastelin status.

In Eastern Europe the equivalent term would be boyar.

Titles used by the higher nobility in medieval Bosnia include Grand duke (person in command of military) in Bosnia specifically Grand Duke of Bosnia, Knyaz, Duke, Prince, etc.

Magnates in Bosnia 
 Grand Duke of Bosnia Pavle Radinović
 Grand Duke of Bosnia Hrvoje Vukčić
 Grand Duke of Bosnia Stjepan Vukčić Kosača
 Grand Duke of Bosnia Vlatko Vuković
 Grand Duke of Bosnia Sandalj Hranić
 Knez Radič Sanković

Magnates with Bosnian court titles:
 Grand Duke of Bosnia

See also
 Velikaš

References

Slavic titles

Vlastelin